Cole Chapel School is a historic school in Hartshorne, Oklahoma. It was built in 1936 and was added to the National Register of Historic Places in 1988.

References

Schools in Oklahoma
School buildings on the National Register of Historic Places in Oklahoma
Romanesque Revival architecture in Oklahoma
School buildings completed in 1936
Buildings and structures in Pittsburg County, Oklahoma
Works Progress Administration in Oklahoma
National Register of Historic Places in Pittsburg County, Oklahoma